Vrh is a small remote settlement on the Rute Plateau in the hills south of Rob in central Slovenia. The entire Municipality of Velike Lašče is part of the traditional region of Lower Carniola and is now included in the Central Slovenia Statistical Region.

References

External links

Vrh on Geopedia

Populated places in the Municipality of Velike Lašče